"Pick Yourself Up" is a popular song composed in 1936 by Jerome Kern, with lyrics by Dorothy Fields.  It has a verse and chorus, as well as a third section, though the third section is often omitted in recordings.  Like most popular songs of the era it features a 32 bar chorus, though with an extended coda.

Background
The song was written for the film Swing Time (1936), where it was introduced by Fred Astaire and Ginger Rogers. Rogers plays a dance instructor whom Astaire follows into her studio; he pretends to have "two left feet" in order to get her to dance with him.  Astaire sings the verse to her and she responds with the chorus.  After an interlude, they dance to the tune.  (Author John Mueller has written their dance "is one of the very greatest of Astaire's playful duets: boundlessly joyous, endlessly re-seeable.")
In 1936, Astaire recorded the song on his own for the Brunswick label.
  
The song has been covered many times, including by:
Nat King Cole  1944
George Shearing	1950
Nat King Cole and George Shearing	1962
Anita O’Day Pick Yourself Up with Anita O'Day 1957
Dakota Staton  1961
Ella Fitzgerald and Nelson Riddle	1962
Frank Sinatra  arranged and conducted by Neal Hefti 1962
Mel Tormé	1988
Natalie Cole  1996
Diana Krall   1999
Molly Ringwald   2013
Wilford Brimley with The Jeff Hamilton Trio   2013
Gregory Porter   2017

Popular culture
The tune served as the theme song for the short-lived 1955–56 prime time television variety series The Johnny Carson Show. It was also the theme song for the 1989–1991 British TV comedy "French Fields" starring Julia McKenzie. It was occasionally used during filmed remotes on Late Night with David Letterman.
Nancy Walker performed the song on an episode of The Muppet Show with Fozzie Bear.
On 20 January 2009, the 44th President of the United States, Barack Obama, in his inauguration speech, quoted the lyrics in the song, saying "Starting today, we must pick ourselves up, dust ourselves off, and begin again the work of remaking America." Frank Rich linked the lyric to Fields and the movie in The New York Times, writing that it was "one subtle whiff of the Great Depression" in the address.
Nat King Cole's version was also featured in the Breaking Bad episode "Gliding Over All."

References

1936 songs
Songs with music by Jerome Kern
Songs with lyrics by Dorothy Fields
Songs written for films
Pop standards
Great Depression songs
Ella Fitzgerald songs
Fred Astaire songs
The Muppets songs